Steffi Martin Walter (17 September 1962 – 21 June 2017) was a German luger who competed during the 1980s, representing East Germany. She won two Olympic gold medals in the women's singles event, two gold medals at FIL World Luge Championships, one gold medal at FIL World Luge Championships, and two silver medals at FIL European Luge Championships.

Personal life
Martin was born in Lauter, Saxony on 17 September 1962. After marriage, she lived in Großdubrau with her husband and had three children. After their first child was born, she took a break from sports but returned later. She quit active sports due to family and health issues and worked as a physiotherapist. She completed her studies in law and worked in county administration. She was named an honorary citizen of Lauter in 1998.

Career
Martin participated and won her first silver medal at the FIL European Luge Championships of 1982 held at Winterberg in Women's Single where Bettina Schmidt took the gold. She won the silver again in 1986 at Hammarstrand (Cerstin Schmidt won the gold.)
 
Martin won two gold medals in the women's singles event at the FIL World Luge Championships of 1983 at Lake Placid, New York and of 1985 at Oberhof, Germany.

Martin was overall Luge World Cup champion in women's singles in 1983–84 shared with fellow East German Bettina Schmidt.

She won gold medal in the women's singles event, first at Sarajevo, Yugoslavia at the 1984 Winter Olympics under her maiden name Martin. She then became the first woman to repeat as Olympic champion at Calgary, Alberta, Canada in the 1988 Winter Olympics; now under her married name Walter. She completed the events in 2:46:570 and 3:03:973 respectively. Her record was equaled by Sylke Otto by winning gold in 2002 and 2006.

Death
Martin died on 21 June 2017 from cancer. She had been diagnosed in October 2016.

References

External links

 Great Olympians
 
 
 

1962 births
2017 deaths
People from Erzgebirgskreis
Olympic lugers of East Germany
German female lugers
Olympic gold medalists for East Germany
Olympic medalists in luge
Lugers at the 1984 Winter Olympics
Lugers at the 1988 Winter Olympics
Medalists at the 1984 Winter Olympics
Medalists at the 1988 Winter Olympics
Sportspeople from Saxony
Recipients of the Patriotic Order of Merit (honor clasp)
Deaths from cancer in Germany